Potawatomi (also spelled Pottawatomie; in Potawatomi , , or ) is a Central Algonquian language. It was historically spoken by the Pottawatomi people who lived around the Great Lakes in what are now Michigan and Wisconsin in the United States, and in southern Ontario in Canada. Federally recognized tribes in Michigan and Oklahoma are working to revive the language.

Language revitalization 
Cecilia Miksekwe Jackson, one of the last surviving native speakers of Potawatomi, died in May 2011, at the age of 88. She was known for working to preserve and teach the language.

Donald Neaseno Perrot, a native speaker who grew up in the Powers Bluff, Wisconsin area, has a series of Potawatomi videos, a website, and books available to preserve the language 

The federally recognized Pokégnek Bodéwadmik Pokagon Band of Potawatomi started a master-apprentice program in which a "language student (the language apprentice) will be paired with fluent Potawatomi speakers (the language masters)" in January 2013. In addition, classes in the Potowatomi language are available, including those at the Hannahville summer immersion camp, with webcast instruction and videoconferencing.

There is also a free online language course from the Pokagon Band of Potawatomi on Mango Languages.

Classification

Potawatomi is a member of the Algonquian language family (itself a member of the larger Algic stock). It is usually classified as a Central Algonquian language, with languages such as Ojibwe, Cree, Menominee, Miami-Illinois, Shawnee and Fox. The label Central Algonquian signifies a geographic grouping rather than the group of languages descended from a common ancestor language within the Algonquian family. Of the Central languages, Potawatomi is most similar to Ojibwe, but it also has borrowed a considerable amount of vocabulary from the Sauk.

Generally, in developments since Indian Removal in the 19th century, Potawatomi has become differentiated in North America among separated populations. It is divided between Northern Potawatomi, spoken in Ontario, Canada; and Michigan and Wisconsin of the United States; and Southern Potawatomi, which is spoken in Kansas and Oklahoma, where certain Pottawatomi ancestors were removed who had formerly lived in Illinois and other areas east of the Mississippi River.

Writing systems

Current writing system
Though no standard orthography has been agreed upon by the Potawatomi communities, the system most commonly used is the "Pedagogical System" developed by the Wisconsin Native American Languages Program (WNALP). As the name suggests, it was designed to be used in language teaching. The system is based on the Roman alphabet and is phonemic, with each letter or digraph representing a contrastive sound. The letters used are a b ch d e é g ' h i j k m n o p s sh t w y z zh.

In Kansas, a different system called BWAKA is used. It too is both based on the Roman alphabet and phonemic, with each letter or digraph representing a contrastive sound. The letters used are ' a b c d e e' g h i I j k m n o p s sh t u w y z zh.

Traditional system
The traditional system used in writing Potawatomi is a form of syllabic writing. Potawatomi, Ottawa, Sac, Fox and Winnebago communities all used it. Derived from the Roman alphabet, it resembles handwritten Roman text. However, unlike the Unified Canadian Aboriginal Syllabics or the Cherokee alphabet, it has not yet been incorporated into the Unicode standards.

Each Potawatomi syllabic block in the system has at least two of the seventeen alphabetic letters, which consist of thirteen consonants and four vowels.

Phonology
Here, the phonology of the Northern dialect is described, which differs somewhat from that of the Southern dialect, spoken in Kansas.

There are five vowel phonemes, four diphthongs, and nineteen consonant phonemes.

 is pronounced  in Michigan and  elsewhere. When it is in a closed syllable, it is pronounced . There are also four diphthongs, spelled .

Obstruents, as in many other Algonquian languages, do not have a voicing distinction per se but what is better termed a "strong"/"weak" distinction. "Strong" consonants, written as voiceless, are always voiceless, often aspirated, and longer in duration than the "weak" consonants, which are written as voiced and are often voiced and are not aspirated.

Vowels

Consonants

Morphology
Potawatomi has six parts of speech: noun, verb, pronoun, prenoun, preverb, and particle.

Pronouns
There are two main types of pronoun: personal pronouns and demonstrative pronouns. As nouns and verbs use inflection to describe anaphoric reference, the main use of the free pronouns is for emphasis.

Personal pronouns
Personal pronouns, because of vowel syncope, resemble those of Odaawaa but structurally resemble more those in the Swampy Cree language:

Correspondences to Ojibwe
The relatively-recent split from Ojibwe makes Potawatomi still exhibit strong correspondences, especially with the Odaawaa (Ottawa) dialect.

Notes

Further reading
 Gailland, Maurice. (1840). English-Potawatomi Dictionary.
 Hockett, Charles Francis.(1987). The Potawatomi Language: A Descriptive Grammar. Ann Arbor, Mich: University Microfilms International.
 Hockett, Charles Francis. (1939). Potawatomi Syntax. Language, Vol. 15, No. 4, pp. 235–248
Hockett, Charles Francis. (1948a). Potawatomi I: Phonemics, Morphophonemics, and Morphological Survey. International Journal of American Linguistics. Vol. 14, No. 1, pp. 1–10 
Hockett, Charles Francis. (1948b). Potawatomi II: Derivations. International Journal of American Linguistics. Vol. 14, No. 2, pp. 63–73
Hockett, Charles Francis. (1948c). Potawatomi III: The Verb Complex. International Journal of American Linguistics. Vol. 14, No. 3, pp. 139–149
Hockett, Charles Francis. (1948d). Potawatomi IV: Particles and Sample Texts. International Journal of American Linguistics. Vol. 14, No. 4, pp. 213–225
Hockett, Charles Francis. (1950). The Conjunct Modes in Ojibwa and Potawatomi. Language, Vol. 26, No. 2, pp. 278–282
 Quimby, George Irving. (1940). Some Notes on Kinship and Kinship Terminology Among the Potawatomi of the Huron. S.l: s.n.
 Wisconsin Native American Languages Project and John Nichols. (1975). Potawatomi Traditional Writing. Milwaukee WI: Great Lakes Inter-Tribal Council.

External links
Potawatomi Language Vocabulary, Audio and Video, Interactive Language Games, Online Courses
Potawatomi Pronunciation and Spelling Guide
The Neshnabe Institute for Cultural Studies - Dedicated to Potawatomi Language Revitalization
Prairie Band Potawatomi Language Project Smokey McKinney, 1997
Prairie Band Potawatomi Language Department
Citizen Potawatomi Department of Language
Hannahville Indian Community Department of Culture, Language and History
Forest County Potawatomi Cultural Center, Library and Museum
Nottawaseppi Huron Band of the Potawatomi Department of Language
Pokégnek Bodéwadmik Pokagon Band of Potawatomi Department of Language and Culture
Match-E-Be-Nash-She-Wish Band of Potawatomi Department of Language and Culture
OLAC resources in and about the Potawatomi language
Potawatomi Dictionary , by the Citizen Potawatomi Nation

 
Central Algonquian languages
Anishinaabe languages
Indigenous languages of the North American eastern woodlands
First Nations languages in Canada
Indigenous languages of Oklahoma
Native American language revitalization